Carlos Moyá defeated Àlex Corretja in the final, 6–3, 7–5, 6–3 to win the men's singles tennis title at the 1998 French Open.

Gustavo Kuerten was the defending champion, but he lost in the second round to Marat Safin, who was appearing in the main draw of a major for the first time.

Seeds

Qualifying

Draw

Finals

Top half

Section 1

Section 2

Section 3

Section 4

Bottom half

Section 5

Section 6

Section 7

Section 8

External links
 1998 French Open Men's Singles draw – Association of Tennis Professionals (ATP)
 1998 French Open – Men's draws and results at the International Tennis Federation

Men's Singles
French Open by year – Men's singles
1998 ATP Tour